The 22511 / 22512 Lokmanya Tilak Terminus–Kamakhya Junction Karmabhoomi Express is a Superfast Express train belonging to Indian Railways Northeast Frontier Zone that runs between  (Mumbai, Maharashtra) and  (Guwahati, Assam) in India.

It operates as train number 22511 from Lokmanya Tilak Terminus to Kamakhya Junction and as train number 22512 in the reverse direction, serving the states of Maharashtra, Chhattisgarh, Odisha, Jharkhand, Bihar,  West Bengal & Assam.

Change of train numbers
 15611 -> 22511
 15612 -> 22512

Coaches
The 22511 / 12 Lokmanya Tilak Terminus–Kamakhya Junction Karmabhoomi Express has two AC 2-tier,  four AC 3-tier, 8 sleeper class, six general unreserved & two SLR (seating with luggage rake) coaches . It does not carry a pantry car.

As is customary with most train services in India, coach composition may be amended at the discretion of Indian Railways depending on demand.

Service

Routing
The 22511 / 12 Lokmanya Tilak Terminus–Kamakhya Junction Karmabhoomi Express runs from 

MAHARASHTRA
Lokmanya Tilak Terminus (Starts)

Akola Junction

Gondia Junction

CHHATISGARH
Raipur Junction

Raigarh railway station

ODISHA
Jharsuguda Junction

JHARKHAND

Pakur railway station
Chakradharpur Junction

WEST BENGAL

Barddhaman Junction

Rampurhat Junction

Hasimara Railway Station

ASSAM
 to
 Kamakhya Junction (Ends).

Traction

References

External links
22511 Karmabhoomi Express at India Rail Info
22512 Karmabhoomi Express at India Rail Info

Express trains in India
Transport in Mumbai
Rail transport in Maharashtra
Rail transport in Chhattisgarh
Rail transport in Odisha
Rail transport in Jharkhand
Rail transport in West Bengal
Rail transport in Assam
Transport in Guwahati
Named passenger trains of India